Joseph Lutz may refer to:
 Joseph Lutz (general), United States Army general
 Joseph Lutz (politician), member of the Maryland House of Delegates

See also
 Joe Lutz, American baseball player and coach
 Josef Lutz, German physicist and electrical engineer.